The 1836 United States presidential election in Delaware took place between November 3 and December 7, 1836, as part of the 1836 United States presidential election. Voters chose three representatives, or electors to the Electoral College, who voted for President and Vice President.

Delaware voted for Whig candidate William Henry Harrison over the Democratic candidate, Martin Van Buren. Harrison won Delaware by a margin of 6.54%.

Results

See also
 United States presidential elections in Delaware

References

Delaware
1836
1836 Delaware elections